CCTV-3 is the art focused channel of the CCTV (China Central Television) Network in the People's Republic of China. This channel is based mainly on dance and music broadcast since November 30, 1995. CCTV-3 is the channel which have a creative boutique programs.

Channel Positioning
CCTV-3 now has a set of entertainment, participation, and appreciation in a "new audio-visual" column to the broad masses of love art audience provides free choice space. To create high-quality column, the purpose of CCTV-3 is to strengthen the program services, entertainment, nationality, participatory, art and the mass, fusion variety, music, information service, literature, dance and other arts programs as a whole.

Prominent hosts
Li Yong
Zhou Yu
Bi Fujian
Dong Qing
Li Sisi

Prominent Performers and Guests
G.E.M
Feixiang
Daniela Anahi Bessia
TFBoys

Shows
 Ding Ge Long Dong Qiang
 Sing My Song
 Dance World
 Art Life
 Xingguang Dadao
 Super 6+1

References

External links
  

China Central Television channels
Television channels and stations established in 2000
2000 establishments in China
Classic television networks